Tropical Storm Lidia was a large tropical cyclone that caused flooding in Baja California Peninsula and parts of western Mexico. The fourteenth tropical cyclone and twelfth named storm of the 2017 Pacific hurricane season, Lidia developed from a large area of disturbed weather west of the Pacific Coast of Mexico on August 31. The storm intensified while moving generally northward or northwestward, peaking with maximum sustained winds of  later that day. On September 1, Lidia made landfall in Mexico near Puerto Chale, Baja California Sur, at peak intensity. The storm weakened while traversing the peninsula, ultimately emerging over the Pacific Ocean on September 3, where the storm degenerated into a remnant low. The system brought thunderstorms and wind gusts to Southern California, before dissipating on September 4.

In anticipation of the storm, several tropical cyclone warnings and watches were issued in the Baja California Peninsula and other areas along the Gulf of California. Flooding in Mexico City resulted in water entering hundreds of homes, while sinkholes formed on some roads. Overall, there were twenty fatalities, including two from electrocution and two from drowning.

Meteorological history

A low-pressure area offshore the west coast of Mexico developed in late August 2017. Early on August 26, the National Hurricane Center (NHC) first discussed the probability of tropical cyclogenesis in a tropical weather outlook (TWO). Initially, the NHC assessed a 0% chance of development within two days and 30% chance within five days, citing marginally favorable conditions. An elongated trough of low pressure formed by late on August 27 and was initially composed of disorganized showers and thunderstorms. After environmental conditions became more favorable and the storm organized significantly – but still lacked a well-defined center – the NHC began classifying the low-pressure area as Potential Tropical Cyclone Fourteen-E at 21:00 UTC on August 29. The low soon developed banding features and intensified throughout the day on August 30.

The storm, which was relatively large, moved north-northwestward due to flow from a weak ridge over Mexico and a weak cyclonic gyre to the west. Shortly after landfall, satellite imagery indicated that convection associated with Lidia was becoming disorganized. The cyclone weakened significantly while traversing the mountainous terrain of the Baja California Peninsula, and by early on September 2, deep convection was mainly limited to a few strong clusters near the center. By that time, Lidia weakened steadily, and emerged over the Pacific Ocean on September 2. However, Lidia continued to weaken due to cold sea surface temperatures. On September 3, Lidia's remnants brought thunderstorms, wind gusts, and flash flooding to Southern California, before being absorbed by another upper-level low off the coast of California, on September 4.

Preparations and impact

Upon the NHC initiating advisories on Potential Tropical Cyclone Fourteen-E at 21:00 UTC on August 29, the Government of Mexico issued a tropical storm warning and a hurricane watch from Todos Santos and Los Barriles in Baja California Sur. At 03:00 UTC on the following day, a tropical storm watch was posted from Los Barriles to San Evaristo. The hurricane watch extended northward to east of La Paz at 15:00 UTC on August 30, while a tropical storm warning was issued from west of La Paz to Loreto and from north of Los Barriles to La Paz. Additionally, a tropical storm watch became in effect from Bahia Tempehuaya to Huatabampito in Sinaloa. Three tropical storm warnings were issued at 21:00 UTC on August 30 from Bahia Tempehuaya to Huatabampito, from La Paz to San Evaristo, and from Santa Fe to Puerto Cortes in Baja California Sur, while a tropical storm watch was posted from Puerto Cortes to Puerto San Andresito.

At 09:00 UTC on August 31, tropical storm warnings were extended from north of Puerto Cortes to Puerto San Andresito, north of San Evaristo to Loreto, and north of Huatabampito to Guaymas, Sonora. Simultaneously, a tropical storm watch was issued from north of Puerto San Andresito to Punta Abreojos, north of Loreto to Bahia San Juan Bautista in the state of Baja California, and north of Guaymas to Bahía Kino in Sonora.

In Mexico City, heavy rainfall disrupted the public transportation network at several locations. A number of roads were flooded, including parts of the Circuito Interior and Avenida Oceanía. Hundreds of homes in the city were flooded. Bad weather conditions at Mexico City International Airport resulted in the cancellation 18 flights and the diversion of about 150 other flights. In Cuautitlán Izcalli, about 300 people were evacuated after the El Ángulo dam collapsed, with water entering hundreds of dwellings, while many other homes were flooded with sewage in Ecatepec de Morelos after a canal overflowed. Flooding triggered red alerts on the color coded alert system in the municipalities of Azcapotzalco, Cuajimalpa, Gustavo A. Madero, Miguel Hidalgo, and Venustiano Carranza, while an orange alert was issued for Cuauhtémoc.

Nationwide, twenty deaths were attributed to the storm, including two from electrocution and two from drowning. Wind advisories were issued for parts of Southern California as the remnants of Lidia continued to move northward. A microburst event in Santa Barbara associated with the remnants of Lidia seriously injured a teenager as she was struck by a canoe at the beach. Damages in Baja California Sur were calculated at MX$2.2 billion (US$123 million), including MX$187 million (US$10.5 million) in infrastructural sector.

See also

 Weather of 2017
 Tropical cyclones in 2017
 List of Eastern Pacific tropical storms
 Other tropical cyclones named Lidia
 List of Baja California Peninsula hurricanes
 Tropical Storm Julio (2008) – Minimal storm that made landfall in a similar location.
 Hurricane Odile (2014) – Took a similar track to Lidia's in Cabo San Lucas, as a Category 3 hurricane.
 Hurricane Newton (2016) – Affected the Baja California Peninsula roughly a year before Lidia.

References

External links

 Tropical Storm Lidia Advisory Archive

Lidia
Lidia (2017)
August 2017 events in Mexico
September 2017 events in Mexico
Lidia
Hurricanes in Baja California
Hurricanes in Baja California Sur